"Holocene" is a song by American indie folk band Bon Iver. It was released as the second single from their album Bon Iver, Bon Iver on September 5, 2011. The single is backed with a cover of Peter Gabriel's song "Come Talk to Me" as a B-side, which was previously released as a limited edition song for Record Store Day. The song was named one of the best songs of 2011 by various music publications. It was nominated for Song of the Year and Record of the Year for the 54th Grammy Awards, and is featured in the Cameron Crowe film We Bought a Zoo, Zach Braff's film Wish I Was Here, the 2014 film The Judge and the Dutch film Just Friends (Gewoon Vrienden) in 2018.

On February 4, 2012, Bon Iver performed "Holocene" on Saturday Night Live.

Background
Front man Justin Vernon explained the song title in an interview with Mojo: "It's partly named after the (geological) era, but it's also the name of a bar in Portland where I had a dark night of the soul." He also stated that "the title is a metaphor for when you're not doing well. But it's also a song about redemption and realizing that you're worth something; that you're special and not special at the same time."

Vernon later explained the origin of the song in a conversation with Aaron Rodgers:

Vernon also explained how Wisconsin influenced his perception and songwriting:

Music video
The music video, directed by Nabil Elderkin, was filmed in the region of Vik in Iceland with a Red Camera. It features a blonde Icelandic boy waking up and roaming around the island's volcanic landscape and glaciers, equipped with just a walking stick. Since the lyrics of "Holocene" describe the idea that the self is part of something greater, the music video highlights the expansive landscapes in contrast to the boy. The video was debuted on the National Geographic Channel. In January 2012, music video blog Yes, We've Got a Video! ranked it at number 10 in their top 30 videos of 2011, saying that the video "should serve as proof that the art of the music video is not dead."

Reception and legacy
The song was highly acclaimed by critics. Pitchfork named it as the second best song of 2011, saying "the rising and falling chord changes create a sense of motion that develops throughout the whole song, a tide-like ebb and flow that ends with an abrupt denouement, so swift it withholds almost as much pleasure as it yields." Rolling Stone ranked it as the 22nd best single of 2011, simply stating that "'[Holocene]' takes sensitive-guy poetry somewhere sublime." The song also won 2nd place in Stereogum's annual Gummy Awards. It was nominated for Record of the Year and Song of the Year at the 54th Annual Grammy Awards, but lost both to Adele's "Rolling in the Deep". It was voted 52nd in the 2011 Triple J Hottest 100.

"Holocene" was also included in the book "1001 Songs You Must Hear Before You Die". In 2019, NPR’s listeners named "Holocene" as the best song of the 2010s.

Charts

Certifications

References

2011 singles
4AD singles
Bon Iver songs
Jagjaguwar singles
Music videos directed by Nabil Elderkin
Songs written by Justin Vernon
Music videos shot in Iceland